CHNC may refer to:

 CHNC-FM, a radio station (107.1 FM) licensed to New Carlisle, Quebec, Canada
 Classical-map hypernetted-chain method